Ilyaz Alimov (born 20 August 1990), was a Kyrgyzstani footballer who was banned for life from playing football in August 2019.

Career

Club
On 2 August 2019, the Asian Football Confederation announced that Alimov had been banned for life for his involvement in a conspiracy to manipulate matches during Alay Osh's 2017 AFC Cup and 2018 AFC Cup campaign.

International
Alimov made his international debut against China, in a 4–0 loss. It took him almost two years to receive his second cap, with it coming on 6 June in a 6–0 loss to the hands of Iran at the Enghelab Stadium, coming on as a substitute. He played in his first international victory in a 2–0 win over Kazakhstan, less than a week after his 26th birthday. He has gone on to play in a further two more national games, but is yet to score a goal.

References

1990 births
Living people
Kyrgyzstani footballers
Association football forwards
Kyrgyzstan international footballers